Aaagh! It's the Mr. Hell Show! is an animated skitcom television show that aired on BBC Two from 28 October 2001 to 18 February 2002. The show was created by David Freedman and Alan Gilbey after the greeting card line about a painfully honest demon created by cartoonist Hugh MacLeod. The basic format was a series of sketches linked by the eponymous Mr. Hell, a Satan-esque host voiced by comedian Bob Monkhouse – the last series before his death in 2003. Mr. Hell delights in making his guests as miserable as possible, and also discusses his own personal problems, to add to the general sense of desolation.

Notable characters in the series include Josh, voiced by Jeff "Swampy" Marsh, who attempts to start a discussion about reincarnation before inevitably getting killed, and Serge the Fashion Industry Seal of Death (an anthropomorphic seal), who wants to take revenge on the fashion industry for killing his parents. Mr. Hell also regularly appears in his own sketches, some featuring his illegitimate son Damien, and Damien's mother Angela, an angel.

Episodes

Awards
 2001 Houston World Festival Platinum Remi Award winner
 2001 Leo Award winner for Best Animation Program or Series
 2002 Gemini Award winner for Best Animated Program or Series

References

External links 

2000s British adult animated television series
2000s British animated comedy television series
2000s British television sketch shows
2000s Canadian adult animated television series
2000s Canadian animated comedy television series
2000s Canadian sketch comedy television series
2001 British television series debuts
2002 British television series endings
2001 Canadian television series debuts
2002 Canadian television series endings
British adult animated comedy television series
British flash animated television series
Canadian adult animated comedy television series
Canadian flash animated television series
English-language television shows
BBC Television shows